Samuele Mulattieri (born 7 October 2000) is an Italian professional footballer who plays as a forward for  club Frosinone, on loan from Inter Milan.

Club career
A youth academy graduate of Spezia, Mulattieri made his professional debut on 14 April 2018 in a 1–1 draw against Frosinone. He scored his first goal following week in a 3–2 defeat against Pescara. He joined Inter Milan after the end of 2017–18 Serie B season.

Mulattieri spent his first two seasons as Inter Milan player with primavera team in Campionato Primavera 1.

On 5 October 2020, he joined Dutch club Volendam on a season long loan deal. On 27 July 2021, he joined Serie B club Crotone on a season long loan deal. On 25 July 2022, he moved to Frosinone on loan, with an option to buy.

International career
On 7 September 2021 he made his debut with the Italy U21 squad, playing as a substitute in the qualifying match won 1–0 against Montenegro.

Career statistics

References

External links
 

2000 births
Living people
Association football forwards
Italian footballers
Italy under-21 international footballers
Italy youth international footballers
Serie B players
Eerste Divisie players
Inter Milan players
Spezia Calcio players
FC Volendam players
F.C. Crotone players
Frosinone Calcio players
Italian expatriate footballers
Italian expatriate sportspeople in the Netherlands
Expatriate footballers in the Netherlands